Benjamin Francis Leftwich (born 4 September 1989) is an English singer-songwriter from York. Leftwich released his first album Last Smoke Before the Snowstorm in 2011 which peaked at #35 on the UK charts. In February 2016 he announced his next album After the Rain on his Facebook page, released on 19 August 2016. Most recently, Leftwich has released four single cover-tracks: Pure Morning (Placebo), Rebellion (Lies) (Arcade Fire), When You Were Young (The Killers), and Because of Toledo (The Blue Nile).

Early life
Leftwich began playing at the age of ten and grew up listening to The Rolling Stones and Nina Simone; later discovering Nick Drake, Bob Dylan, and Elliott Smith. He cites Cher, Arcade Fire, Ryan Adams, and Bruce Springsteen as inspirations.

Education
Leftwich was educated at Hempland Primary School, and then at Bootham School.

Life and career
Leftwich's debut album, the Ian Grimble-produced Last Smoke Before The Snowstorm, was released in July 2011. The Fly called it "a majestic debut"  The Skinny, while the Sunday Express called it "lovely". Hazel Sheffield, writing in The Guardian, gave it a 3/5 rating, as did David Pollock, writing for The Scotsman, who drew comparisons to Damien Rice and José González. Leftwich's "Shine" was named Spotify's most addictive track of 2014, the most repeat-played song of the year. Leftwich sold more than 100,000 copies of Last Smoke and received over 150 million global Spotify plays. "Atlas Hands" was featured in Zillow's TV Commercial 'Lake House' in 2015 In this same year, Benjamin Francis Leftwich co-wrote "Grow" with British artist Frances which featured in the Amazon UK TV advert.

His second album After the Rain, was released in August 2016. Performing songs off this album and his former, he toured extensively from April 2016 to August 2017, covering the UK, Canada, USA, China, Sweden, Denmark, Germany, the Netherlands, and throughout Asia (e.g., Hong Kong, Singapore, Indonesia). Since 2011, Leftwich has gained 2,510,535 monthly listeners and over 219,000 followers on Spotify.

Discography

Albums

EPs

Singles

References

External links
 

1989 births
Living people
English male singer-songwriters
Musicians from York
People educated at Bootham School
Vagrant Records artists
21st-century English singers
Dirty Hit artists
21st-century British male singers